William Alvin Moody (April 10, 1954 – March 5, 2013) was an American professional wrestling manager and licensed funeral director. He is best known for his tenure with the World Wrestling Federation (WWF, later WWE) where he performed under the ring name and gimmick of Paul Bearer, manager and guiding light of The Undertaker. As Paul Bearer, he hosted his own talk show segment entitled The Funeral Parlor. 

As Paul Bearer, Moody is also known for managing his storyline son/Undertaker's storyline half-brother, Kane, as well as archnemesis of The Undertaker, Mankind. Vader also served as Bearer's 
protégé for a short period while feuding with The Undertaker. Outside WWE, Moody was known by the name Percival "Percy" Pringle III and performed in various regional territories and promotions, as well as World Class Championship Wrestling (WCCW).

Early life 
Moody was born in Mobile, Alabama, on April 10, 1954, and attended San Antonio College and the University of South Alabama.

Professional wrestling career

Early career (1974–1990) 

Moody entered professional wrestling in his teenage years as a ringside photographer. After high school, he enlisted in the United States Air Force, serving four years on duty; during this time, he often wrestled for independent promotions during off-duty hours. 

In 1979, Moody began managing as Percival "Percy" Pringle III in southeastern independent promotions; a few years earlier, in June 1974, he wrestled as Mr. X. There had been previous Percy Pringles in wrestling who were not William Moody. He was given the name by booker Frankie Cain. Immediately after his first son's birth, he cut back his involvement in the wrestling business in order to obtain a degree in mortuary science and earn certification as an embalmer and mortician.

In 1984, he resumed full-time involvement in the wrestling business, using his Pringle character in Championship Wrestling from Florida and World Class Championship Wrestling in Texas. During this time, he was WCCW's answer to Bobby Heenan by doing "Heenan" like promos, even looking like Heenan as well with the blonde hair and attire. He served as manager for numerous wrestlers; he notably managed Rick Rude, "Stunning" Steve Austin, and Mark Calaway in their early careers. As Percy Pringle, he was also associated with the careers of Lex Luger, Eric Embry, and The Ultimate Warrior.

World Wrestling Federation / World Wrestling Entertainment (1990–2002)

Managing The Undertaker (1990–1996) 
Moody joined the World Wrestling Federation (WWF) on December 22, 1990, after being mentioned by Rick Rude to WWF owner Vince McMahon. McMahon used Moody's real-life involvement in the funeral industry to create the character of Paul Bearer, a name given to him by Road Warrior Hawk and a play on the term pallbearer. In his portrayal of a very histrionic, ghostly manager, Bearer regularly communicated in his shaky, high-pitched, wailing voice and was almost always seen bearing an urn, which led to his mantra, "the power of the urn," allowing his main protégé The Undertaker to revive strength. His keeper-of-the-urn gimmick led to several storylines in which The Undertaker's antagonists stole his urn, causing The Undertaker to lose much of his supernatural strength. Bearer's catch phrase was "Ooooh, yes!"

Moody made his first appearance in February 1991, as a heel, when Brother Love, who originally managed The Undertaker, delegated Bearer to take on the role of The Undertaker's manager. Complementing The Undertaker's Deadman gimmick, Bearer took on a spooky, ghastly character. Bearer hosted his own WWF talk show segment entitled The Funeral Parlor, which included memorable moments such as the Ultimate Warrior being locked inside a casket, among others. Also on The Funeral Parlor in early 1992, The Undertaker and Bearer turned face when Undertaker stopped former ally Jake "The Snake" Roberts from ambushing Randy Savage and Miss Elizabeth with a chair backstage; the Undertaker and Roberts had a match at WrestleMania VIII, which saw Undertaker win.

Managing Mankind and Kane (1996–1998)  

Eventually Bearer turned heel again by betraying his long-time protege at SummerSlam 1996 to align himself with The Undertaker's arch-enemy, Mankind; during this time, he hired The Executioner & Vader, in order to take out Undertaker. In April 1997 at In Your House 14: Revenge of the 'Taker, The Undertaker set Bearer's face ablaze using a fireball, which was done in retaliation for Bearer having Mankind set a fireball to The Undertaker's face several weeks prior. Resulting from The Undertaker's actions, Bearer suffered (kayfabe) burns to his face and was bandaged for a time. Once healed from the burns, Bearer changed his looks, shedding the makeup of ghostly pallor and jet-black color to his natural strawberry blond hair and less make-up. No longer using his ghostly appearance and mannerisms, he became loudmouthed and shrill. 

Around mid-1997, Paul Bearer coerced Undertaker (WWF Champion at the time) into being his protégé again with the ultimatum of revealing a deep, dark secret from their past. During this time, Bearer made references to the "fires of hell," likening The Undertaker's dark secret to The Undertaker's act of setting fire to his face. Under duress, The Undertaker accepted after several weeks of resistance. While "managing" Undertaker this time around, Bearer engaged in tyrannical behaviors towards him, harassing him constantly. Eventually, Undertaker lost his patience and refused to allow Bearer to continue being his manager, leading Bearer to reveal the secret.

The dark secret suggested that Bearer had a disturbingly traumatic past with The Undertaker which long preceded Brother Love's joining the two in January 1991. The dark secret dates back to The Undertaker's youth and involves domestic matters: Paul Bearer, while working for The Undertaker's parents in their family funeral home business, witnessed a felony act during The Undertaker's teens. The Undertaker had committed an arson murder, burning down his parents' family funeral home, in the process, killing them. This act also killed The Undertaker's younger "brother"—or so The Undertaker long thought. Bearer, who was not in the fire, hid Kane in a mental asylum during the rest of Kane's youth into adulthood. At the time throughout mid to late 1997, The Undertaker denied all this, claiming it was his younger half-brother's fault. Bearer, blaming The Undertaker, accused him of being an "arsonist", "murderer", and "liar." (Connected to these accounts, it was later learned once Kane had already debuted that he was actually a half-brother to The Undertaker. The Undertaker's mother had an affair with Bearer and, as a result, gave birth to Kane. Bearer unintentionally (kayfabe) revealed to a Raw audience that he was actually Kane's father. This came to light when Bearer informed Jerry Lawler on Monday Night Raw, at a point in which he thought cameras had stopped rolling for a commercial break but were still on. Up until that point, The Undertaker was under the impression that Kane was fully related to him and his family. Presumably, The Undertaker's deceased father lived his entire life under the same impression). Because of the fire incident, The Undertaker thought his "brother" had been dead for years, claiming he was "pyromaniac" obsessed with starting fires and, due to the incident, couldn't possibly even be alive. However, Bearer introduced the vengeful, fire-personified Kane in October 1997 at Badd Blood: In Your House. In this first appearance for the character, Kane cost The Undertaker a Hell in a Cell match against Shawn Michaels. This led to a bitter rivalry between The Undertaker and Kane and Bearer. Kane was not revealed as Bearer's son until April 27, 1998, on Monday Night Raw, a day after the first Inferno Match, at Unforgiven, where Kane was set on fire. The Undertaker was shown to have also been unaware of this at that time, and helped to build the feud up further, as Undertaker initially refused to believe the story until an in-story DNA test proved it to be true. The feud lasted into summer of 1998, when Kane seemingly abandoned Bearer to side with The Undertaker, beginning a face turn.

The Ministry of Darkness (1998–1999)  

Bearer and The Undertaker became a heel team again toward the end of 1998 when Bearer betrayed his own son, Kane, in favor of managing The Undertaker once again. Once becoming a heel with Bearer, The Undertaker shamelessly admitted to setting the funeral home ablaze for which he had initially claimed was an accident or blamed Kane. Shortly thereafter, Bearer (returning in early 1999 to his signature black hair and mustache, but wearing a buttoned sweater and black overcoat, without the pasty white makeup and speaking in the same voice as his 1997 predecessor) and The Undertaker formed the Ministry of Darkness.  Both he and The Undertaker took a hiatus from the WWF unceremoniously in September 1999 as a result of The Undertaker suffering an injury.

Final appearances (2000)  
In February 2000, Bearer, who turned face once more briefly, returned to WWF television as Kane's manager (now wearing a red overcoat), aiding and assisting his son in his war against D-Generation X, but retired from on-screen performing shortly after WrestleMania 2000. Later that year, he went backstage to serve as a WWF road agent, stage manager, and talent scout. His contract with WWE ended on October 14, 2002.

NWA Total Nonstop Action (2002–2003) 
Moody spent the next year working with NWA Total Nonstop Action Wrestling (NWA-TNA) under the ring name Percy Pringle III.

Return to WWE (2003–2005, 2007)
In October 2003, he signed a new three-year contract with WWE. When Jim Ross contacted him about rejoining the company, Paul at first refused the offer, but Ross then called again with an offer. At that time, he was suffering from health problems and depression related to his obesity and underwent gastric bypass surgery in November 2003. As a signing bonus, WWE agreed to pay for the surgery, as Ross promised.

After recovering, he reappeared as Paul Bearer in March 2004 at WrestleMania XX, alongside Undertaker in a match against Kane.

In spring of 2004, Paul Bearer was kidnapped by The Dudley Boyz under the direction of Paul Heyman; this was set up in order to temporarily write Bearer out of WWE story lines because he had to undergo emergency gallbladder surgery after suddenly developing gallstones, a common side effect of gastric bypass surgery.

For the June 27, 2004 pay-per-view The Great American Bash, a match pitting The Undertaker against both of The Dudley Boyz was booked. Paul Bearer was encased in a glass "crypt" at ringside, covered up to his chest in cement. Heyman demanded The Undertaker throw the match or Bearer would be suffocated in cement.

The Undertaker won the match but proceeded afterwards to pull the lever that sent cement into the crypt, completely burying Paul Bearer, suffocating him. On the following week's SmackDown!, Bearer was acknowledged to be alive, although gravely injured, for storyline purposes; the rehearsal taping earlier in the day of the Bash – with Undertaker ad-libbing and only half of the stunt complete, in an empty arena – was leaked onto the internet dirt sheets and actually broadcast live by accident in many of the television markets. As he had two years remaining on his contract, however, Bearer was used as a booker for the company up until WWE decided to terminate his contract on April 11, 2005.

On June 10, 2005, Bearer announced that he had signed a new deal with WWE, allowing it to market his personality and requiring he attend autograph sessions, make promotional appearances and occasionally work television and house shows. In late January 2007, at a SmackDown!/ECW house show in Mobile, Alabama, Bearer joined The Brothers of Destruction at ringside, carrying the original urn.

Independent circuit (2010–2012) 

Bearer returned to the Boston-based Millennium Wrestling Federation as top heel manager along with John "Bradshaw" Layfield after four years, leading "Stalker" Dylan Kage at Soul Survivor VI against The Iron Sheik and "Black Machismo" Jay Lethal in the Sheik's retirement match on April 24, 2010.

On October 12, 2012, Bearer managed Vader against Rikishi at Pro Wrestling Syndicate in Rahway, New Jersey.

Second return to WWE (2010, 2012) 
On the September 24, 2010, episode of SmackDown, Bearer made his first on-screen appearance in six years after being brought out in a casket. He helped The Undertaker, who was feuding with Kane over the World Heavyweight Championship, by restoring Undertaker's powers with the urn. Bearer officially became Undertaker's manager again by accompanying him to the ring for his match against Kane for the title at the Hell in a Cell pay-per-view. During the match, Bearer once again turned on Undertaker, after shining a light in his eyes when he was about to Tombstone Kane. He then let Kane hit Undertaker with the urn to help him win. On the October 15 episode of SmackDown, Bearer challenged Undertaker to face Kane in a Buried Alive Match for the World Heavyweight Championship at Bragging Rights, to which Undertaker accepted by attacking Kane. At Bragging Rights, Kane once again defeated Undertaker after interference by Bearer, who was almost thrown in the grave by Undertaker, and The Nexus, who helped Bearer and Kane bury Undertaker.

Kane then entered a feud with Edge, after he was named the new challenger to Kane's World Heavyweight Championship at Survivor Series. On the November 12 episode of SmackDown, Kane cost Edge his match against Nexus member David Otunga. After the match, Edge kidnapped Bearer by strapping him in a wheelchair. Later that night, Edge used Bearer to cost Kane his match against Big Show. The following week, Edge tormented Bearer throughout the night by throwing a dodgeball at him and force feeding and throwing pizza all over him. Edge then used Bearer to call for Kane in the parking lot, but Kane wasn't able to get Bearer in time as Edge attacked him and drove off with Bearer. At Survivor Series, Edge brought an empty wheelchair causing Kane to go mad frantically trying to interrogate him on where Bearer was held. Even though the match ended in a draw, Kane was unable to find Bearer as Edge wheeled his enemy into a barricade. On the November 26 episode of SmackDown, Kane demanded that Edge to let Bearer go, but Edge refused. Kane attempted to track down Bearer, but was unable to find him. Kane offered a second title shot to Edge, which he accepted, but continued to keep Bearer with him. At the end of the night, Edge lured Kane to the parking lot, where Edge drove over a dummy version of Paul Bearer, with the actual Paul Bearer in the backseat of the car. On the December 3 episode of SmackDown, Edge continued his mind games with Kane by pushing a dummy version of Paul Bearer down some stairs. Then, after Edge defeated Kane in a non-title match, he brought out a Paul Bearer lookalike. Kane then went to search for Bearer again, but Edge drove away in a truck with Bearer tied up on the back. The following week, Kane begged Edge to return Bearer, but Edge once again refused. Kane then refused to participate in the main event that night and once again searched for Bearer. After seeing what he thought was a dummy version of Paul Bearer on top of two ladders, Kane pushed them over. Afterward, Kane saw that he pushed the actual Paul Bearer off the ladders onto the concrete floor, thus, injuring him and writing him out of the storyline.

In April 2012, Bearer returned for a brief stint as a part of Kane's ongoing feud with Randy Orton. He was kidnapped by Orton and then stuck in a storage freezer while strapped to a wheelchair. Kane later came for Bearer, only to roll him back into the freezer and saying, "I'm saving you... from me". This would mark Bearer's final appearance in WWE. Bearer was planned to reunite with The Undertaker and Kane on WWE Raw 1000 in July 2012 but could not make the event due to scheduling and travel conflicts.

Other media 
Paul Bearer has been a playable character in at least five WWE-licensed video games: WWF Attitude, WWF WrestleMania 2000, WWF SmackDown!, WWF No Mercy, and WWF SmackDown! 2: Know Your Role. Bearer was also featured as a manager in the THQ video game WWE Legends of WrestleMania in 2009 (depending on whether or not he's paired with The Undertaker, he enters with or without his signature urn). In 2010, Moody did voice over work as Paul Bearer for the game, WWE SmackDown vs. Raw 2011, where he was featured in one of the Road To WrestleMania storylines for the game, as well as a selectable manager. He was also in WWE All Stars (during The Undertaker's "Path of Champions", voiced again by Moody), WWE '13, and WWE 2K14 as a selectable manager and part of the Attitude Era single-player mode, and 30 Years of WrestleMania mode respectively representing The Brothers of Destruction. Bearer further appeared as a manager in WWE 2K15 (from the "Path of the Warrior" Showcase DLC) and WWE 2K16 (as part of the "Austin 3:16" Showcase).

Personal life 
Moody married Dianna McDole in December 1978 and had two sons, Michael and Daniel. Daniel wrestles on the independent circuit as DJ Pringle. Dianna died due to complications resulting from breast cancer on January 31, 2009.

Moody's health improved after his gastric bypass surgery. One year earlier, he admitted that he had weighed 525 pounds (238 kg) before the operation but dropped to under 300 pounds.

In September and October 2005, he conducted three shoot interviews for Ring of Honor. Two were done exclusively about him, talking about his career in wrestling. The third was with friend and fellow wrestling manager Jim Cornette. He returned full-time to his funeral business in 2006. In 2005, Moody, with three partners, started his own independent promotion known as Gulf South Wrestling. He dissolved the company in May of 2007 after learning that his partners wanted to force him out of the promotion and operate it without him. On September 21, 2014, his son Michael died.

Death 
On March 2, 2013, Moody attended the annual Gulf Coast Wrestlers Reunion in Mobile, Alabama, riding a wheelchair. According to club board member "Cowboy" Bob Kelly, Moody was having breathing difficulties at the event. He was coughing, and told friends he was going to seek treatment for respiratory problems as he had trouble standing at the time. Kelly said that Moody was treated for a blood clot after the reunion. On March 5, 2013, Moody died in Mobile, Alabama, at the age of 58 due to a heart attack. The cause of the heart attack was supraventricular tachycardia, which causes a dangerously high heart rate. He is interred beside his wife at Serenity Memorial Gardens Cemetery in Theodore, Alabama.

Hall of Fame and legacy 

Following his death, Moody became a driving point in WWE storylines; the March 11 episode of Raw was held as a tribute to Bearer. The Undertaker paid tribute but was interrupted by CM Punk, his WrestleMania 29 opponent. Punk then mocked Bearer over the next few weeks against both The Undertaker and Kane, including stealing his urn and attacking Kane with it. On the April 1 episode of Raw, Paul Heyman dressed up as Paul Bearer and Punk poured the ashes of the urn onto The Undertaker after attacking him. At WrestleMania 29, The Undertaker defeated Punk and took back the urn, dedicating his victory to Paul Bearer.

On the March 3, 2014 episode of Raw it was announced that Paul Bearer would be inducted into the WWE Hall of Fame. At the ceremony itself, Kane inducted Bearer, and his sons Michael and Daniel Moody accepted the induction; afterwards, The Undertaker came out in character and paid tribute.

On February 24, 2016, his Hall of Fame ring was shown on Pawn Stars; the seller stated his ring was given to him by his family. Moody's son Daniel later stated that the ring was a fake.

On November 22, 2020, a hologram of Paul Bearer appeared for The Undertaker's final farewell at Survivor Series while The Undertaker performed his trademark kneeling pose.

Awards and accomplishments 
 Cauliflower Alley Club
 Lou Thesz Award (2013)
 Gulf Coast Wrestlers Reunion
 Lee Fields Gulf Coast Wrestling Hall of Fame (2014)
 Pro Wrestling Illustrated
 Manager of the Year (1998)
 WWE
 WWE Hall of Fame (Class of 2014)

References

Bibliography

External links 

 
 
 
 

1954 births
2013 deaths
American male professional wrestlers
American funeral directors
Professional wrestlers from Alabama
Professional wrestling managers and valets
Professional wrestling trainers
Sportspeople from Mobile, Alabama
United States Air Force airmen
The Undertaker
WWE Hall of Fame inductees